John Arch (born October 6, 1964) is a politician in the U.S. state of Nebraska who has served in the Nebraska Legislature from the 14th district since 2019.

He was elected to the Legislature in 2018 to represent Nebraska's 14th legislative district. He serves on three committees: Health and Human Services, Urban Affairs, and General Affairs.  He was an at-large member of the Nebraska Economic Development Task Force and serves as the chairman of the Youth Rehabilitation Treatment Center Special Oversight Committee.

Electoral history

References

1955 births
21st-century American politicians
Living people
Republican Party Nebraska state senators
Speakers of the Nebraska Legislature
University of Nebraska alumni